Richard Estigarribia (born 15 August 1982) is a Paraguayan footballer.

Honours

Club
Cobreloa
 Primera División de Chile (1): 2004 Clausura

External links

1982 births
Living people
People from Itauguá
Paraguayan people of Basque descent
Paraguayan footballers
Paraguayan expatriate footballers
Paraguay international footballers
Kyoto Sanga FC players
12 de Octubre Football Club players
Cobreloa footballers
Cobresal footballers
Ayacucho FC footballers
Sport Áncash footballers
S.D. Aucas footballers
Club Deportivo Universidad César Vallejo footballers
Total Chalaco footballers
José Gálvez FBC footballers
Oriente Petrolero players
Club Sportivo San Lorenzo footballers
Cienciano footballers
Paraguayan Primera División players
Paraguayan Segunda División players
Chilean Primera División players
Peruvian Primera División players
Ecuadorian Serie A players
J1 League players
Bolivian Primera División players
Paraguayan expatriate sportspeople in Japan
Paraguayan expatriate sportspeople in Chile
Paraguayan expatriate sportspeople in Peru
Paraguayan expatriate sportspeople in Ecuador
Paraguayan expatriate sportspeople in Bolivia
Expatriate footballers in Japan
Expatriate footballers in Chile
Expatriate footballers in Peru
Expatriate footballers in Ecuador
Expatriate footballers in Bolivia
Association football forwards